Aleksandr Martynov or Alexandr Martynov (born 1 January 1981) is a Transnistrian politician who was the Prime Minister of Transnistria from 17 December 2016 to 30 May 2022 under the presidency of Vadim Krasnoselsky.

Biography
Alexandr Martynov was appointed Prime minister of Transnistria on 17 December 2016. He placed the payments of pensions and salaries on the top of its agenda, along with tariffs and taxes for companies. He also promised free access to public transportation. As soon as January 2017, he announced his will to emulate the Russian economic model and favor Russian ties.

In February 2017, he managed the financial turmoil and the pressure from Moldova to invade the country and gain back the land. In July, he criticized Ukraine's and Moldova's move to establish joint custom checkpoints at the border of Transnistria. In August 2017, he asked the Russian forces not to go through Transnistria in the Russian military intervention in Ukraine.

In October 2017, he announced an 11% increase in the national industrial production.

Related pages
Prime Minister of Transnistria
Politics of Transnistria

References

1981 births
Living people
People from Tiraspol
Prime Ministers of Transnistria
Government ministers of Transnistria